Liguori may refer to:

Places 
Liguori, Missouri, unincorporated community in Jefferson County, Missouri, United States
Saint-Liguori, Quebec, parish municipality located on the Rouge River in the Regional County Municipality of Montcalm in Quebec

People 
 Surname
Alphonsus Liguori (1696–1787), Roman Catholic Bishop, writer, Theologian, and founder of the Congregation of the Most Holy Redeemer
Church of St. Alphonsus Liguori, Rome, church located on the Via Merulana on the Esquiline Hill of Rome, Italy
Al Liguori (1885–1951), Italian born cinematographer
Alphonse Liguori Chaupa (1959–2016), Roman Catholic bishop
Alphonsus Liguori Penney (1924–2017), Canadian Roman Catholic priest who was Archbishop of St.John's from 1979 to 1991
Ann Liguori, American sports radio and television personality
Aurélien Lopez-Liguori (born 1993), French politician
Ciro Liguori (born 1969), Italian rower
Frédéric Liguori Béique (1845–1933), Canadian lawyer and politician
Liborio Liguori (born 1950), retired Italian footballer
Luigi Liguori (born 1998), Italian football player
Peter Liguori (born 1960), American business executive
PJ Liguori (born 1990), British video blogger and filmmaker
Ralph Liguori (1926–2020), former American racing driver from New York City
Vincenzo De Liguori (born 1979), Italian footballer

 Given name
Liguori Lacombe (1855–1957), Member of Parliament in the House of Commons of Canada